James Gurnett (born October 10, 1949) is a former politician from Alberta, Canada. He served as a member of the Legislative Assembly of Alberta from 1985 until 1986. He is currently the principal of Common Place Services, doing a variety of consulting work, primarily with NGOs.

Career

James Gurnett is a former Executive Director of Edmonton Mennonite Centre for Newcomers from 2001-2009. EMCN is a civil society organization providing programs and services for people who are immigrants and refugees, including settlement assistance, language training, employment and career services, community development, counseling, housing, and advocacy. The vision of the organization was that newcomers to Edmonton will achieve full participation, strengthening and enriching the lives of the whole community.

Previously, Gurnett was Manager of Community Services at Bissell Centre, serving people living in poverty in Edmonton’s urban core (1999–2001). Prior to that he was founding Executive Director of The Hope Foundation (1993–1999), affiliated with the Faculty of Education at the University of Alberta, as a centre for research and services related to the intentional use of hope as a means of enjoying enhanced quality of life.

For 15 years Gurnett worked as teacher, program facilitator and administrator at schools in Alberta and Afghanistan (Teacher, Bowness High School, Calgary; Vice Principal, Ahlman Academy; Kabul, Afghanistan; Teacher, American International School of Kabul; Principal, Whitelaw School; Program Facilitator, Fairview School Division; Principal, Rycroft School; Principal, Woking School; Principal, Blueberry Creek School).

He has been a Member of the Legislative Assembly of Alberta (Spirit River-Fairview, 1985–86), Chief of Staff for the NDP caucus at the Alberta Legislature (2010-2012), Director of Communications and Outreach for the Official Opposition at the Alberta Legislature (1990–1993), and a newspaper editor.

Gurnett was elected to the Alberta Legislature in a by-election for Spirit River-Fairview after the local MLA, party leader Grant Notley, died in a plane crash. He was a candidate for the New Democrats

The Legislature was dissolved a little more than a year later and he ran for a second term in office. His electoral district of Spirit River-Fairview was redistributed for the 1986 Alberta general election and he ran in the new electoral district of Dunvegan. The election was a hotly contested two way race that saw him lose by two hundred votes to Progressive Conservative candidate Glen Clegg. He attempted to win his seat back in the 1989 Alberta general election. Despite a strong showing Clegg won his second term by a larger margin.

Gurnett then ran in Sherwood Park (electoral district) in the 1993 provincial election, placing third.

Gurnett has four adult children and eight grandchildren. He is part of St. Faith’s (Anglican) parish. He writes sometimes for Alberta Street News.

Recent community service includes:
•	Chair, Canadian Immigrant Settlement Sector Alliance
•	Board member, Edmonton Chamber of Voluntary Organizations
•	Communications spokesperson, Edmonton Coalition on Housing and Homelessness
•	Member, Social Work Program Advisory Committee, Grant MacEwan College

Current areas of service include:
•	Member, Organizing Committee, Edmonton Good Friday Outdoor Way of the Cross
Treasurer, Board of Directors, Alberta Street News
Member, Board of Directors, Boyle-McCauley News.

He has had a children's book, The Meeting Place, published by the Alberta Association of Immigrant Serving Agencies, and is author of one chapter in Search for Equality and Justice, Alberta's Human Rights Story, a book on the history of human rights in Alberta, published in 2012 by the John Humphrey Centre for Peace and Human Rights. He is also author of Together, Creating a Better World, a handbook for community work to end gender discrimination (2014).

He was educated at the Universities of Alberta (B.A., 1969) and Calgary.

Previous volunteer commitments have included:
Board member, Mahatma Gandhi Canadian Foundation for World Peace
Chair, Alberta Association of Immigrant Serving Organizations
Campaign Cabinet, United Way of the Alberta Capital Region
Chair, Homefest planning committee, Edmonton Coalition on Housing and Homelessness
Member, A Learning Alberta (2005–2006)—Minister of Advanced Education initiative

Recognitions:
Queen’s Golden Jubilee Medal (2004)
Queen's Diamond Jubilee Medal (2013)
Alberta Centennial Medal (2005)
Project Ploughshares Edmonton Salvos Prelorentzos Peace Award (2007)
University of Alberta Distinguished Alumni Award (2008)
Homeward Trust Edmonton Larry Shaben Award for Outstanding Leadership in the Housing Sector 
Grant MacEwan College (2008) Honorary diploma in Community Studies
Edmonton Interfaith Centre for Education and Action community service award (2009)
Alberta Venture magazine (2007) "Alberta’s 50 Most Influential People"

References

External links
Legislative Assembly of Alberta Members Listing

1949 births
Living people
Alberta New Democratic Party MLAs
Politicians from Calgary